Gradante is a surname. Notable people with the surname include:

Anna-Maria Gradante (born 1976), German judoka
Charles J. Gradante (born 1945), American businessman